Tamil Jains (Tamil Samaṇar, from Prakrit samaṇa "wandering renunciate") are ethnic-Tamils from the Indian state of Tamil Nadu, who practice Jainism, chiefly the Digambara school (Tamil ). The Tamil Jain is a microcommunity of around 85,000 (around 0.13% of the population of Tamil Nadu), including both Tamil Jains and north Indian Jains settled in Tamil Nadu. They are predominantly scattered in northern Tamil Nadu, largely in the districts of Tiruvannamalai, Kanchipuram, Vellore, Villupuram, Ranipet and Kallakurichi.
Early Tamil-Brahmi inscriptions in Tamil Nadu date to the third century BCE and describe the livelihoods of Tamil Jains. Samaṇar wrote much Tamil literature, including the important Sangam literature, such as the Nālaṭiyār, the Silappatikaram, the Valayapathi and the Seevaka Sinthamaṇi. Three of the five great epics of Tamil literature are attributed to Jains.

History

Origins

Some scholars believe that Jain philosophy must have entered South India some time in the sixth century BCE. Literary sources and inscription state that Bhadrabahu came over to Shravanabelagola with a 12,000-strong retinue of Jain sages when north India found it hard to negotiate with the 12-year long famine in the reign of Chandragupta Maurya. Even Chandragupta accompanied this constellation of sages. On reaching Shravanabelagola, Bhadrabahu felt his end approaching and decided to stay back along with Chandragupta and he instructed the Jain saints to tour over the Chola- and Pandyan-ruled domains.

According to other scholars, Jainism must have existed in South India well before the visit of Bhadrabhu and Chandragupta. There are plenty of caves as old as fourth century with Jain inscriptions and Jain deities found around Madurai, Tiruchirāppaḷḷi, Kanyakumari and Thanjavur.

A number of Tamil-Brahmi inscriptions have been found in Tamil Nadu that date from the second century BCE. They are regarded as associated with Jain monks and lay devotees.

The exact origins of Jainism in Tamil Nadu is unclear. However, Jains flourished in Tamil Nadu at least as early as the Sangam period. Tamil Jain tradition places their origins are much earlier. The Ramayana mentions that Rama paid homage to Jaina monks living in South India on his way to Sri Lanka. Some scholars believe that the author of the oldest extant work of literature in Tamil (3rd century BCE), Tolkāppiyam, was a Jain.

Tirukkural by Thiruvalluvar is considered by many to be the work of a Jain by scholars like V. Kalyanasundarnar, Vaiyapuri Pillai, Swaminatha Iyer, and P. S. Sundaram. It emphatically supports strict vegetarianism (or veganism) (Chapter 26) and states that giving up animal sacrifice is worth more than thousand burnt offerings (verse 259).

Silappatikaram, the earliest surviving epic in Tamil literature, was written by a Samaṇa, Ilango Adigal. This epic is a major work in Tamil literature, describing the historical events of its time and also of then-prevailing religions, Jainism, Buddhism and Shaivism. The main characters of this work, Kannagi and Kovalan, who have a divine status among Tamils, Malayalees and Sinhalese were Jains.

According to George L. Hart, who holds the endowed chair in Tamil Studies by University of California, Berkeley, has written that the legend of the Tamil Sangams or "literary assemblies", was based on the Jain sangham at Madurai:
There was a permanent Jaina assembly called a Sangha established about 604 CE in Madurai. It seems likely that this assembly was the model upon which tradition fabricated the Sangam legend.

Jainism became dominant in Tamil Nadu in the fifth and sixth century CE, during a period known as the Kalabhra interregnum.

Decline and survival
Jainism began to decline around the eighth century CE, with many Tamil kings embracing Hindu religions, especially Shaivism. Still, the Chalukya, Pallava and Pandya dynasties embraced Jainism. The Shaivite legend about the impalement of the Jains in Madurai claims that 8000 Jains were impaled after they lost a contest against the Saivites, Thirugnana Sambandhar was invited by the queen of Madurai to check the atrocities against Jains and their influence on the King; however, this legend is not mentioned in any Jain text According to Paul Dundas, the story represents the abandonment of Madurai by Jains for various reasons or the gradual loss of their political influence.

Jainism survived in the region during the period of decline. The Melsithamur matha was established by a monk Shantisager who arrived from Shravanabelgola sometime during the 9-12th century period as attested by the 12th century inscriptions. A Jain center associated by Acharya Akalanka in the eighth century survives at Thiruparuttikundram near Kanchi. The Tamil Jain texts of this period include 13th-century (orlater) Aruṅkalacceppu, 14th cent.  Mērumantarapūrāṇam and the  15th-century Śrīpurāṇam.

Revival
When India became independent in 1947, Madras Presidency became Madras State, comprising present day Tamil Nadu, coastal Andhra Pradesh, South Canara district Karnataka, and parts of Kerala. The state was subsequently split up along linguistic lines. In 1969, Madras State was renamed Tamil Nadu, meaning Tamil country.

Acharya Nirmal Sagar was the first Digambar Jain monk to reenter Tamilnadu in 1975 after a gap of several centuries. After him some of the Jain nuns have visited Tamilnadu resulting in a renaissance of Jainism among the Tamil Jains. Many abandoned and crumbling temples have been renovated as a result of renewed interaction between Tamil Jains and the Jains from the rest of India. Financial grants have been provided by Bharatiya Digambar Jain Tirth Samrakshini Mahasabha and the Dharmasthala institutions. Local Jain scholars and activists have started "Ahimsa walks" to bring attention to the Tamil Jain heritage.

Archaeological evidences
Archaeological remains in Tamilnadu are discovered time to time that attest to popularity of Jainism in Tamilnadu.  Most of the rock inscriptions are related to the Jain  ascetics who used to commonly reside in hill caves.
The ruins of Anandamangalam vestiges were discovered in Anandamangalam, a small hamlet near Orathi village in Kancheepuram district of Tamil Nadu. The ruins had the rock-cut sculptures of yakshini (tutelary deity) Ambika and tirthankara Neminatha and Parshvanatha.

Population
The total number of Jains in Tamil Nadu as per 2011 Indian census is 83,359, which forms 0.12% of the total population of Tamil Nadu (72,138,958). This include the Jains who have migrated from North India (mainly Rajasthan and Gujarat). The population of Tamil Jains is estimated to be 25,000-35,000.

The Tamil Jains are ancient natives of Tamil Nadu and belong to the Digambara sect. They generally use the title Nainar. A few in Thanjavur District, use Mudaliar and Chettiar as titles.
The former North Arcot and South Arcot (now  Tiruvannamalai, Vellore, Cuddalore and Villupuram Districts) districts have a large number of Jain temples, as well as a significant population of Tamil Jains.

At present, most of the Tamil Jains are from the Vellalar social group. Also, the Saiva Velaalar sect are originally believed to have been Jainas before they embraced Hinduism. The Tamil Jains refer to the Saiva Velaalar as nīr-pūci-nayinārs or nīr-pūci-vellalars meaning the vellalars who left Jainism by smearing the sacred ash or (tiru)-nīru. While some of the Jains assign this conversion to the period of the Bhakti movement in Tamil nadu others link it to a conflict with a ruler of the Vijayanagar empire in the 15th century. The villages and areas settled by the Saiva Velaalar even now have a small number of Jaina families  and inscriptional evidence indicate that these were earlier Jaina settlements as is evident by the existence of old Jaina temples.

The title Nainar has been used since antiquity for Jain monks. In Cilappatikaram a Jain temple is mentioned as Nayinar Koil and the Kalugumalai inscription refers to Jaina munis as Nayinar. It is akin to the term Sahu or Sadhu in North Indian Jain inscriptions.

Religious head

Bhattaraka Laxmisena

Swasthi Shree Bhattaraka Laxmisena Swamiji of Jina Kanchi Jain Mutt or madam at Mel-Sithamoor (near Tindivanam, Villupuram District) is one of the religious heads of the community. He performs the Upadesam ceremony for Jain children. In the past, this mutt had been the centre for religious study, guiding and helping the economic activities of its members, organising religious discourses, maintenance of temples and such activities. The mutt was able to achieve such multifarious operations with the help and contributions of its members. At present the mutt is also maintaining a gousala (for cows and others).

The present finance position of the mutt is inadequate for even day-to-day maintenance. Planting of coconut and mango trees has been started to increase the revenue of the fund for the purpose of day-to-day maintenance of the mutt.  The car ('ther') in the mutt requires replacement of wooden wheels.

Swasthi Shree Dhavalakeerthi Bhattaraka Swamiji 

In addition to the above, a new mutt named Arahanthgiri Jain Math located at Thirumalai near Polur, Tiruvannamalai district, has been functioning from 8 February 1998 with the name Dhavalakeerthi Swamigal. Now in the mutt around 2300 students are studying from primary to higher secondary school including Jain philosophy with free boarding and lodging. Maintenance of the above is done through contributions from donors.

Lifestyle
The traditional occupation of the majority of the Tamil Jain families has been landowners of agricultural land. Now many are teachers. A considerable number of them are settled in urban areas, they are employed in public and private sectors. A small population has settled overseas (US, Canada, UK, Australia and other places).

Cuisine 
Tamil Jains are ardent vegetarians. With the turn of the 20th century, they were a self-sustained rural-based farming community. They were landowners and used contract labourers for their agricultural activities. Their household included large tracts of land, cattle, and milch cows. They had kitchen gardens growing vegetables for their daily need. Dairy food such as milk, curd, butter and ghee were cooked in house. Daily food was very simple consisting of a brunch with rice, cooked lentils (paruppu), ghee, vegetable sambar, curd, sun-dried pickles of mango, lemon or citron, and deep-fried sun-dried 'crispies' (vadavam) made from rice pie. Evening snacks of deep-fried lentil preparations and before sunset dinner consisting either idli, dosa or rice with buttermilk and lentil chutney (thogaiyal). While seniors, people undergoing religious fast and ardent followers of religious principles avoided garlic, onions and tubers in their daily food, these were occasionally used by others in the household.

Identity
Tamil Jains are well assimilated in Tamil society, without any outward differentiation. Their physical features are similar to Tamils. Apart from certain religious adherences, practices and vegetarianism, their culture is similar to the rest of Tamil Nadu. However, they name their children by the names of Tirthankaras and characters from Jaina literature.

Lifetime ceremony
Ezhankaapu - on the seventh day of its birth, a new born baby is adorned with bracelets.
 
Kaathu Kutthal - ear piercing and adorning child with earrings. This ceremony is mostly performed in either Aarpakkam temple or Thirunarangkondai i.e.Thirunarungkundram. (Appandai Nathar is the deity).

Other Ceremonies

Upadesam - the formal induction into religious practices and adherences is called Upadesam.  This is done to both boys and girls, at around the age of 15.  After Upadesam, one is supposed to follow religious practices with vigor and seriousness.

Marriage - outwardly, Jain marriages resemble Hindu marriages.  However, the mantras chanted are Jain. There is no Brahmin priest; instead there is a Samaṇar called a Koyil Vaadhiyar or temple priest, who conducts the ceremonies.

Pilgrimage - most Jains go on pilgrimage to tirthas and major Jain temples in North India - Sammed Shikharji, Pavapuri, Champapuri and Urjayanta Giri - as well as places in South India such as Shravanabelagola, Humcha or Hombuja Humbaj, Simmanagadde in Karnataka and Ponnur Malai in Tamil Nadu.

There are private amateur tour operators as well who take pilgrims to newly identified ancient Tamil Jain sites in western Tamil Nadu (kongunadu) and northern Kerala (vayanadu).

Funeral rites - the dead are placed on a pyre and incinerated. Ashes are then disbursed in water courses and ceremonies are performed on 10th or 16th day.  Annual remembrance ceremonies similar to Hindu practice are not performed. But no festivities or functions are followed that year on the paternal side.

Festivals
Akshaya Tritiya commemorates the first Tirthankara, Rishabha, partaking food after many long years of penance.
Jinaratri commemorates Rishabha's moksha.
Mahavir Janma Kalyanak celebrates Tirthankara Mahavira's birth.
Diwali commemorates Mahavira's moksha.
Vasant Panchami honors the Jain Agamas
Upaakarma commemorates the Chakravartin Bharata, son of Rishabha, acknowledging the true scholars by awarding them the Upanayana.
Karthikai Deepam at the onset of the month of Kartika
Puthandu and Thai Pongal are the other common festivals celebrated along with other Tamils.

Religious practices

Full moon days, Chaturdasi (14th day of the fortnight), Ashtami (8th day of the fortnight) are days chosen for fasting and religious observations. Women take food only after reciting the name of a tirthankara five times.  People undertake such practices as a vow for certain period of time - sometimes even for years.  On completion, Udhyapana festivals (special prayer services) are performed, religious books and memorabilia are distributed. People who take certain vows eat only after sunrise and before sunset.

List of Tamil Jains
 Prof. A. Cakravarti Nayanar, scholar and author, including  "Jaina Literature in Tamil", 1941,
 Jeevabandhu T.S Sripal
 S. Sripal, Director General of Police in Tamil Nadu. 
Prof. J. Srichandran, Founder, Varthamanan Padippagam 
 Air Marshal Simhakutty Varthaman.
 Wing Commander Abhinandan Varthaman.

Temple locations

Cave temples 

 Tirumalai (Jain complex)
 Kalugumalai Jain Beds
 Thirakoil
 Samanar Hills
 Sittanavasal Cave
 Kurathimalai, Onampakkam
 Panchapandavar Malai
 Seeyamangalam
 Kanchiyur Jain cave and stone beds
 Ennayira Malai
 Andimalai Stone beds, Cholapandiyapuram
 Adukkankal, Nehanurpatti

Puja temples 
is done in the following old (built several centuries ago) and new (built in the last 100 years) Tamil Digambara Jain temples(in alphabetical order):

Aadhinath Jain Temple, Cuddalore (old)
Anumanthakudi, Sivagangai dt.(new)
Adambakkam, Adi Nath Digambar Jain Temple Chennai  (New)
Agalur, Villupuram Dt. (Old)
Agarakorakottai, Thiruvannamalai Dt. (New)
Alagramam Jain Temple, Villupuram Dt. (Old)
Arahanthgiri Jain Math, Thiruvannamalai Dt. (Old)
Arani (S.V.Nagaram), Thiruvannamalai Dt. (Old)
Arani (Pudukamur), Thiruvannamalai Dt. (New)
Arani (Saidapet), Thiruvannamalai Dt. (New)
Arani (Palayam), Thiruvannamalai Dt. (New)
Arani (Kosapalayam) Thiruvannamalai Dt. (New)
Arani (sevoor) Thiruvannamalai
Arungulam Kanchipuram Dt. (Old)
Arpaakkam, Kanchipuram Dt. (Old)
Arugavur, Solai, Thiruvannamalai Dt. (Old)
Avadi, Chennai Dt.(New)
Ayalavadi, Thiruvannamalai Dt. (New)
Chitharal Jain Temple,(Old) : ninth century temple
 Chitharal malaikovil,(Old) : before 425 CE
Cheyyar, Thiruvannamalai Dt. (New)
Deepangudi, Nagapattinam Dt. (Old)
Easaakolathur, Thiruvannamalai Dt. (Old)
Elangadu, Thiruvannamalai Dt. (Old)
Eyyil, Villupuram Dt. (Old)
Erumbur, Thiruvannamalai Dt.(Old)
George Town, Chennai Dt. (New)
Gingee, Viluppuram Dt. (Old)
Ilayangudi, Sivagangai Dt. (New)
Kannalam, Villupuram Dt. (Old)
Kallapuliyur, Villupuram Dt. (Old)
Kallakullathur, Villupuram Dt. {old}
Karanthai, Kanchipuram Dt. (Old)
Karanthai Jain Temple, Thanjavur Dt. (Old)
 Kalugumalai Jain Beds Dt. (Old)
 Kanchiyur Jain cave and stone beds Dt. (Old)
 Kattumalaiyanur, Thiruvannamalai Dt. (New)
Keezh Villivanam, Thiruvannamalai Dt. (Old)
Keezh Edayalam, Villupuram Dt.
Kilsathamangalam, Thiruvannamalai Dt. (Old)
Koliyanur, Villupuram Dt.(Old)
Kolathur, Chennai Dt. (New)
Kovilampoondi, Thiruvannamalai Dt (Old)
Kumbakonam, Thanjavur Dt. (Old)
Mannargudi Mallinatha Swamy Jain Temple, Nagapattinam Dt. (Old)
Melapandal, Vellore Dt. (New)
Melmalaiyanur, Villupuram Dt. (Old)
Mel Sithamur Jain Math, Villupuram Dt.
Mettu Street, Kanchipuram (New)
Mudalur, Thiruvannamalai Dt. (Old)
Nallavanpalayam, Thiruvannamalai Dt.(New)
Nallur, Thiruvannamalai Dt. (Old)
Nanganallur, Chennai Dt. (New)
Naval, Thiruvannamalai Dt. (Old)
Nedimolliyanur Villupuram Dt. {old}
Nelliyankulam, Thiruvannamalai Dt. (Old)
Othalavaadi, Thiruvannamalai Dt. (New)
Parshwa Padmavathi Jain Temple, Sundampatti, Orappam Krishnagiri Dt. (Old)
Pammal, Chennai (New)
Peranamallur, Thiruvannamalai Dt (Old)
Perani, Villupuram Dt. (Old)
Peravoor, Villupuram Dt. (Old)
Periyakozhappalur, Thiruvannamalai Dt. (Old)
Perumandur, Villupuram Dt. (Old)
Perumbogai, Thiruvannamalai Dt. (Old)
 Poondi Arugar Temple, (Old)
Ponnur Malai, Thiruvannamalai Dt. (Old)
Puzhal, Chennai Dt. (New)
Renderipet, Thiruvannamalai Dt. (New)
R.Kunnathur, Thiruvannamalai Dt. (New)
Shri Vasupujya Temple, Sathuvachari, Vellore Dt. (old)
Sathuvachari, Vellore Dt. (New)
Sevur, Vellore Dt. (Old)
Sitharaal, Nagercoil Dt. (Old)
Sittanavasal, Pudukottai Dt. (Old)
Sitthamur, Villupuram Dt. (Oldest Jain temple and Jain math)
Somaasipadi, Thiruvannamalai (New)
Thellar, thiruvannamalaiDt.
Thirunarunkundram, Villupuram Dt. (Old)
Thiruparuthikundram temple, Kanchipuram Dt. (Old)
Thirupanamoor, Thiruvannamalai Dt. near Kanchipuram
Thachambadi, Thiruvannamalai Dt. (Old)
Thatchur, Thiruvannamalai Dt. (Old)
Thayanur, Villupuram Dt. (Old)
Thennathur, Thiruvannamalai Dt.(old) 
 Thirakoil, Thiruvannamalai Dt. (Old)
 Thirupparankunram, Madurai Dt.(Sangam literature Paripadal 19 step 51)
Thiruvannamalai, Thiruvannamalai Dt. (New)
Thondur, Villupuram Dt. (Old)
Tindivanam, Villupuram Dt (New)
Tirumalai,Polur Dt.(Old)
Trilokyanatha Temple, Kanchipuram Dt (Old)
Valathi / Valathy, Villupuram Dt. (Old)
Vandavasi, Thiruvannamalai Dt. (Old)
Valapandal Vellore Dt. (Old)
Veedur, Villupuram Dt. (Old)
Veeranamur, Villupuram Dt. (Old)
Vellimedupettai, Villupuram Dt. (Old)
Vempoondi, Villupuram Dt. (Old)
Venbakkam, Kanchipuram Dt. (Old)
Vilangadupakkam, Chennai Dt. (Old)
Vizhukkam, Villupuram Dt. (Old)
Vijayamangalam, Erode Dt. (Old)
Virudur, Thiruvannamalai Dt. (Old)
Nasiyan Jain Temple,Prithvi Raj Road,ooty,dedicated to Rishabhdevji.
Sri 1008 Vaupujya Swamy Swethambar Jain Temple, Ooty

Photo gallery

Tamil Jain Books
"Jeevaka Chinthamani", "Sripurana" by J Srichandran.

See also

Jain Sculpture
Jainism in Tamil Nadu
Shikharji
Mandalapuruder

Notes

Citations

References

External links
French Institute of Pondicherry Project on Jaina Temples of Tamil Nadu - a combined DVD/website project presently being prepared for publication that will include information on over 400 Jain sites around Tamil Nadu.
Tamil Jains
Jain vestiges

1008 Jainism Books Launched in Single Pen Drive by Acharya Suvidhisagarji Maharaj in Chennai, Tamilandu
 Jainism in Tamilnadu Blog
Jainism Resource Center 

Social groups of Tamil Nadu
Tamil Jain
Jain, Tamil
Jain communities
Vegetarianism